"In the Back of My Mind" is a song by British-American band Fleetwood Mac from their 15th studio album, Behind the Mask (1990). The song was released as the album's second single for select European markets but only had a minor impact in the United Kingdom, peaking at  58. It was not made commercially available in North America, where "Hard Feelings" was released as the second single instead. Both singles were co-written by Billy Burnette, who was one of the guitarists enlisted to replace Lindsey Buckingham in 1987.

Background
In a Q&A with The Penguin, Burnette noted that the band combined three 48-track machines to fit all of their overdubs on "In the Back of My Mind". At the time, that feat almost landed the band in the Guinness Book of World Records for the most individual tracks used for one song.

The B-side of "In the Back of My Mind", "Lizard People", was written by Mick Fleetwood and Peter Bardens, a former bandmate of Fleetwood. "Lizard People" is one of the few Fleetwood Mac songs to feature Fleetwood on lead vocals.

Track listings
7-inch single
 "In the Back of My Mind" (edit)
 "Lizard People"

12-inch single
 "In the Back of My Mind" (LP version)
 "Little Lies" (live)
 "The Chain" (live)

Credits
Fleetwood Mac
 Christine McVie – piano, electronic organ, synthesizer, lead and backing vocals
 Stevie Nicks – backing vocals
 Billy Burnette – rhythm guitar, lead vocals
 Rick Vito – lead guitar, backing vocals
 John McVie – bass guitar
 Mick Fleetwood – drums, finger cymbals, tambourine, gong, talking drum, spoken word

Additional personnel
 Stephen Croes – Synclavier, synthesizers, percussion

Charts

References

1990 singles
1990 songs
Fleetwood Mac songs
Songs written by Billy Burnette
Songs written by David Malloy
Warner Records singles